Macropsobrycon is a genus of characins from eastern South America.  The currently described species in this genus are:

 Macropsobrycon uruguayanae C. H. Eigenmann, 1915 – Uruguay, Tramandaí and Lagoa dos Patos basins.
 Macropsobrycon xinguensis Géry, 1973 – Xingu River basin.

References
 

Characidae
Fish of South America
Taxa named by Carl H. Eigenmann